A Presidential Unit Citation is a unit citation awarded by the president of a state.

Specific awards include:
 Presidential Unit Citation (United States), awarded for actions on or after December 7, 1941, World War II
 Vietnam Presidential Unit Citation, August 15, 1950, considered obsolete since South Vietnam no longer exists 
 Philippine Republic Presidential Unit Citation, awarded to U.S. military and Philippine military for actions during and after World War II
 Republic of Korea Presidential Unit Citation, awarded to South Korean military and foreign military for defense of the Republic of Korea

See also 
PUC (disambiguation)